Captain Tractors Private Limited (CTPL) is an Indian mini tractors and agriculture equipment manufacturing company headquartered in Rajkot, Gujarat. The company has received several awards, including 4 national and 3 state awards.

History 
The company was founded as Asha Exim Pvt Ltd in 1994 by duo brothers G.T. Patel and M.T. Patel from the state of Gujarat and changed its name to Captain Tractors.

The first mini tractor was launched by the company in India in 1998  and named after the brand as Captain. 

The company started manufacturing agricultural implements and machinery for different farming systems after it received an approval from the Government of India. Its Captain DI 2600 model received a subsidy approval from the Government of India in 2004. In 2008, CTPL received two national awards from the Government of India.

In 2012, the company entered into a strategic partnership with TAFE Group for small tractor series.

CTPL has about 60 percent market share in the mini tractor segment. In 2013 the company received an award for the Best R&D and Entrepreneurship from the Ministry of Micro, Small, and Medium Enterprises, India.

In 2017, CTPL was a participant at the 77th edition of SIMA, the international agri-business show that was held from 26 February to 2 March 2017 at the Paris Nird Villepinte in France. The company has PA approval from countries including Germany, Spain, France, Portugal, Greece, Saudi Arabia, Belgium, Canada, Holland, Ivory Coast, Tunisia, Egypt, and Austria. It also received the Homologation certificate for European countries.

In 2021, CTPL initiated a Memorandum of Understanding agreement with the Government of Gujarat during the Vibrant Gujarat 2021 event for a total investment of Rs 100 crore committing to generate employment for 1790 people in Rajkot.

Awards 

 2008 - Awarded two National Award for R&D efforts by the Government of India
 2011 - Best MSME award by the Government of Gujarat
 2015 - Awarded two National Award for Product Innovation & Outstanding Entrepreneurship in Micro & Small Enterprises
 2021 - Farm Power Awards
 2021 - ITOTY Award

References

External links 

 Official website
 Captain Tractors on The Economic Times

Agricultural machinery manufacturers of India
Tractor manufacturers of India
Indian companies established in 1994
Vehicle manufacturing companies established in 1994
Companies based in Gujarat
Rajkot